Maharani Indra Kumari was a member of the 6th Lok Sabha of India. She represented the Aligarh (Lok Sabha constituency) of Uttar Pradesh and is a member of the Janta Party (S) political party. She was princess of Jagamanpur State of District Jalaun, Uttar Pradesh daughter of Captain Raja Virendra Shah & wife of Raja Chetanraj Singh of Gabhana State education at Loreto Convent

References 

India MPs 1977–1979
Politicians from Aligarh
1969 births
Living people
Lok Sabha members from Uttar Pradesh
People from Aligarh district
People from Jalaun district
Women in Uttar Pradesh politics
20th-century Indian women politicians
20th-century Indian politicians
Janata Party (Secular) politicians
Janata Party politicians